is a Japanese film directed by Masahiro Kobayashi. It won the Golden Leopard at the 2007 Locarno International Film Festival.

Reception
It won the Golden Leopard at the 2007 Locarno International Film Festival.

References

External links

Films directed by Kobayashi Masahiro
Golden Leopard winners
2007 films
2000s Japanese films